Master Chief Petty Officer Omkar Singh (born 8 August 1984) is an Indian sports shooter. He won three gold medals and a silver medal in shooting events at the 2010 Commonwealth Games held in Delhi. He hails from Anuppur district of Madhya Pradesh and is currently serving the Indian Navy.

On 5 October 2010, Omkar Singh and Deepak Sharma won a silver medal in the Men's 50 metre pistol pairs at the Commonwealth games. Omkar Singh won his first gold medal in the Men's 50 metre pistol singles on 6 October 2010. The next day, he paired up with Gurpreet Singh to win the gold medal in the Men's 10m Air Pistol (Pairs). On 8 October 2010, he won a gold medal in the Men's 10m Air Pistol (Single).

Omkar Singh belongs to the Kotma Colliery in the Anuppur district of Madhya Pradesh. His father was a teacher in the South Eastern Coal Fields Limited (SECL) School.

In 2012, he was given the Arjuna Award.

References

External links
 Profile at ISSF
 Omkar Singh at Olympic Gold Quest

Indian male sport shooters
Shooters at the 2010 Commonwealth Games
Commonwealth Games gold medallists for India
Living people
1984 births
People from Anuppur district
Indian Navy personnel
Sport shooters from Madhya Pradesh
Recipients of the Arjuna Award
Shooters at the 2010 Asian Games
Shooters at the 2014 Asian Games
Commonwealth Games medallists in shooting
Asian Games competitors for India
21st-century Indian people
Medallists at the 2010 Commonwealth Games